is a town located in Aomori Prefecture, Japan.

Geography
Hashikami occupies the far southeast corner of Aomori Prefecture, facing the Pacific Ocean. The coastline is rugged and highly indented, forming numerous small bays. A portion of the coastal areas of the town were within the borders of the Tanesashi Kaigan Hashikamidake Prefectural Natural Park, which was incorporated into the Sanriku Fukkō National Park in 2013.

Neighbouring municipalities 
Aomori Prefecture
Hachinohe
Iwate Prefecture
Karumai
Hirono

Climate
The town has a cold maritime climate characterized by cool, short summers and long, cold winters with heavy snowfall  (Köppen climate classification Cfa). The average annual temperature in Hashikami is 9.5 °C. The average annual rainfall is 1172 mm with September as the wettest month. The temperatures are highest on average in August, at around 22.2 °C, and lowest in January, at around -2.2 °C.

Demographics
Per Japanese census data, the population of Hashikami peaked at around the year 2000 and is in gradual decline.

History
The area around Hashikami has been inhabited since ancient times, and a number of Buddhist temples in the area claim to have been founded in the Nara period or Heian period. During the Edo period, it was controlled by the Nambu clan of Morioka Domain, and after 1664, was part of Hachinohe Domain. With the establishment of the modern municipalities system on 1 April 1889,  Hashikami Village was proclaimed from the merger of eight small hamlets. It was elevated to town status on May 1, 1980.

Government
Hashikami has a mayor-council form of government with a directly elected mayor and a unicameral town council of 14 members. Hashikami is part of Sannohe District which contributes three members to the Aomori Prefectural Assembly. In terms of national politics, the town is part of Aomori 2nd district of the lower house of the Diet of Japan.

Economy
The economy of Hashikami is heavily dependent on commercial fishing and agriculture, including the raising of chickens and pigs. The town also serves as a bedroom community for the nearby city of Hachinohe.

Education
Hashikami has six public elementary schools and two public middle schools operated by the town government, and one public elementary school and public middle school shared with Hachinohe. The town does not have a high school.

Transportation

Railway
East Japan Railway Company (JR East) -  Hachinohe Line
  –

Highway

Local attractions
Sanriku Fukkō National Park

Noted people from Hashikami
Jūmonji Tomokazu – sumo wrestler

References

External links

Official Website 

 
Towns in Aomori Prefecture
Populated coastal places in Japan